Glenea superba is a species of beetle in the family Cerambycidae. It was described by Stephan von Breuning in 1958. It is found in India.

References

superba
Beetles described in 1958